Ulanów  is a town in Nisko County, Subcarpathian Voivodeship, Poland, with 1,491 inhabitants (02.06.2009).

It has grammar schools and high schools along with 2 churches. One of the churches was set on fire in 2004, and was closed for repairs. After about a year the church was reopened. Every year in June summer festival is held to celebrate the culture, customs and the people of the town. Festivities include a ritual during which people sing songs and drop a burning wreath, made of pine cones and flowers,  from the bridge on the river.  Additional customs follow. Such as setting rafts on the San river. These rafts are double bottomed and develop whirlpools randomly and are very difficult to steer and navigate. They are made out of wooden logs and have a small covered area where the food is stored and kept from getting wet. Rafts leave San river from Ulanów and float to Gdańsk.  This tradition is kept to commemorate the log trade that was a big part of the culture of the town around 100 years ago.  People drop baskets of flowers with a candle in the middle on the river. Torches are lit as the wooden hand made rafts continue and are not allowed to return to shore until the torches are burnt out. The mayor of the town overlooks the ceremonies from the boat.  The ceremonies end with the cannon shot in the air and the fireworks.  The mayor of Ulanów was Andrzej Bąk, who was elected in 2005. He died in 2008 and his successor is Stanisław Garbacz.

History
The town of Ulanów was founded in 1616 by a nobleman Stanislaw Ulina. Due to the location at the confluence of the San river and the Tanew, Ulanów was a river port, with a harbour and boat building shops. The town prospered until the Swedish invasion of Poland (1655–1660), when it was ransacked and destroyed.

Following the first partition of Poland, Ulanów was in 1772 annexed by the Habsburg Empire, and remained within Austrian Galicia until late 1918. In the 19th century, it was a private town, and belonged to several noble families.

World War I brought widespread destruction, followed my mass exodus and reduction of the population of Ulanów. As a result, it lost its town charter in 1934, remaining a village until 1958.

Jews of Ulanów
Ulanów was once a multicultural town with Jewish population of about 40%.  Around World War I, the Jewish population was halved.  Many died during World War I because of hard work and lack of sufficient food.  Their homes and businesses were looted during the war.  Anti-Semitism was increasing and in 1905 the Jews were falsely charged with denigrating the cross that stood in the road.  The Jewish population was decimated in World War II and none remain today.

References

Cities and towns in Podkarpackie Voivodeship
Nisko County
Kingdom of Galicia and Lodomeria
Lwów Voivodeship
Shtetls